Anna Vishkaee Eskamani (born May 20, 1990) is an American politician who is the member of the Florida House of Representatives from the 47th district in Orange County. She is the first Iranian American in the Florida legislature. Eskamani is a Democrat supporting abortion rights, increased gun control, increasing expenditures on public education, and increasing environmental regulations such as a banning plastic bags. She has worked for Planned Parenthood.

Early life and education
Eskamani was born in Orlando, Florida, to parents who immigrated to the United States from Iran. Eskamani has an older brother Arya and a twin sister Ida. In 2004, Eskamani's mother died of colon cancer.

Eskamani attended University High School in Orlando, Florida, from 2004 to 2008, where she participated in after school technical theater and graduated in 2008. She received two bachelor's degrees in 2012 and two master's degrees in 2015 from the University of Central Florida (UCF). She also earned two certificates and taught at UCF as an adjunct professor. She is pursuing a PhD at UCF in public affairs.

In 2020 she was selected by the University of Central Florida (UCF) as a member of their Distinguished Alumnus, the highest annual honor UCF Alumni bestows upon a graduate.

Political career

Planned Parenthood
According to Eskamani, she first became involved with Planned Parenthood as a patient in 2008. With abstinence-only education at her public school, she turned to Planned Parenthood for information about family planning and reproductive health. From there, Eskamani began volunteering at her local Planned Parenthood affiliate, and in 2012 was hired to serve as a development coordinator. She worked at Planned Parenthood for six years, rising to become the organization's senior director of public affairs and communications for the merged affiliate known as Planned Parenthood of Southwest and Central Florida.

2018 Florida House of Representatives campaign

On July 3, 2017, Eskamani announced her candidacy for the 47th district seat in the Florida House of Representatives. She ran for the open seat vacated by Republican Mike Miller, who had served two terms in the district before announcing a run for Congress. Over the course of her 2018 campaign, Eskamani received endorsements from prominent community leaders, organizations, and politicians. This included President Barack Obama, Orlando Mayor Buddy Dyer, Congresswoman Stephanie Murphy, Equality Florida, AFL–CIO, and the Florida Professional Firefighters State Association.

Eskamani identifies as a progressive Democrat, and focused her campaign on enhancing public education, protecting the environment, ensuring health care access and prioritizing gun control legislation.

During her campaign, Eskamani gained national media attention for her advocacy on women's issues and gun control legislation. Pulse nightclub is located in Florida's 47th district, and Eskamani often spoke about gun violence. She was featured on the cover of Time magazine, in The Atlantic, the New York Times, the Independent, by MTV News, Teen Vogue, and in a Vice News documentary series.

The Orlando Sentinel described Eskamani's as one of the most contentious races in the area. Her Republican opponent, Stockton Reeves VI, sent out at least twenty-five pieces of mail alongside three television ads that were negative towards Eskamani. Eskamani addressed each attack directly. Despite being a first time candidate, Eskamani raised more than $522,000 for her campaign.

Eskamani prevailed in the general election on November 6, 2018, winning 57 percent of the vote over the 43 percent for Republican candidate Stockton Reeves. Eskamani became the first Iranian-American to serve in the Florida Legislature.

2019 Florida legislative session
Eskamani was appointed to serve on four legislative committees in the Florida House of Representatives: Local, Federal & Veterans Affairs Subcommittee, Oversight, Transparency & Public Management Subcommittee, PreK-12 Quality Subcommittee, and Ways & Means Committee. During the first week of legislative committee meetings in Tallahassee, Eskamani made a public decision to not attend a freshman reception hosted by Associated Industries of Florida. Eskamani was quoted as saying, "I didn't come here for ritzy parties".

During the 2019 legislative session, Eskamani was featured by the Tampa Bay Times as being on the front lines of the abortion debate. She was also a leader for the failed attempt to run out the clock on legislation that would define sanctuary city policies in Florida law.

When a woman who alleged domestic violence was charged with armed burglary and grand theft for entering into her husband's locked apartment and taking his guns into the Lakeland, Florida, police in June 2019, Eskamani tweeted that an arrest was "ridiculous" in this kind of situation. She sent a letter stating to State Attorney Brian Haas stating "Prosecuting Ms. Irby sets a scary precedent that if someone seeks help to escape abuse, they will be punished for it." The State Attorney's Office dropped all charges for both parties who were involved in a highly emotional contested divorce action in order for them to resolve their issues in a family law court. Eskamani also filed legislation in 2019 to eliminate statutory limitations for a minor who experienced sexual assault, legislation that ultimately became law in 2020.

Eskamani is an advocate for public education, school safety, and environmental protection. Eskamani sponsored ten bills herself and co-sponsored more than sixty. She also succeeded in securing $80,000 for a Central Florida nonprofit focused on human trafficking prevention called the Lifeboat Project. She was also successful in working across the aisle to increase arts and cultural funding statewide by 800%.

2020 Florida legislative session
Eskamani continued to serve on Local, Federal & Veterans Affairs Subcommittee, Oversight, Transparency & Public Management Subcommittee, and Ways & Means Committee but was removed from the PreK-12 Quality Subcommittee likely for being "too vocal" on her support of public education. 
 
On November 5, 2019, during Committee Weeks for the upcoming 2020 legislative session, Eskamani and Senator José Javier Rodríguez were successful in preventing Investor Owned Utilities (IOU) in Florida from having lower energy efficiency goals under the Florida Energy Efficiency Conservation Act (FEECA). Eskamani spoke before the Florida Public Service Commission in support of higher energy efficiency goals than the proposed goals and more emphasis on renewable energy sources. Eskamani also spoke for the need for Florida to establish new cost-benefit measurements versus the current use of the Ratepayer Impact Measurement (RIM) Test.  Eskamani has tried to raise awareness on the role the Florida Public Service Commission plays in the lives of everyday Floridians.

During the 2020 legislative session Eskamani played a leading role in seeking an investigation of the Florida Coalition Against Domestic Violence, a state organization whose CEO received more than $7.5 million in compensation over a three-year period, including millions of dollars in paid time off. The investigation ultimately led to the State of Florida ending its contract with the organization.

Eskamani also worked with Senator Randolph Bracy to file the legislation to end the school-to-prison pipeline. Filed in honor of Kaia Rolle, a six-year-old black Orlando girl who was arrested by police. The legislation Eskamani introduced would set a statutory limitation on the arrest of minors. The bill took shape as several amendments between the House and Senate chambers and did not pass in the final hours of the legislative session.

One of the biggest debates during the 2020 legislative session was focused on education. Eskamani filed legislation to prohibit public dollars from going to any voucher school that discriminate against students or parents for identifying as LGBTQ+. She also supported public school teachers receiving a pay raise but pushed for additional funding than what was provided.

Another issue Eskamani championed focused on corporate taxation. During the 2020 legislative session Eskamani sponsored numerous amendments to remove special interest tax breaks from the main tax package. She also filed amendments for Florida to implement combined reporting in an effort to close corporate tax loopholes. In addition, Eskamani worked with the Minority Caucus members to file several amendments to repeal a corporate tax refund of $543 million, stating that those dollars could be spent on essential state services versus be sent back to major corporations. No amendment passed.

2020 Florida House of Representatives campaign
In 2020, Eskamani won her re-election bid with a greater vote margin than she did in 2018, receiving 59 percent of the vote.

Much of her campaign consisted of virtual events and her constituent services, particularly for unemployed Floridians. On the campaign end, the team hosted numerous virtual phonebanks, and events, including one event with actor Mark Hamill. During the onset of the coronavirus pandemic, Eskamani suspended her campaign field activities from March until June, focusing on relaying public health information. Additionally, during the year of 2020 and 2021, Eskamani's legislative office fielded thousands of unemployment claims, earning her national recognition. The Tampa Bay Times, and other news outlets reported on how her office helped countless claimants navigate the unemployment website established by the Florida Department of Economic Opportunity. This propelled her campaign forward locally, earning her the endorsement of the Orlando Sentinel, and a nomination from the newspaper's board and readers for her work helping unemployed Floridians.

2021 Florida Legislative Session 
Following her reelection to the Florida State House, Anna Eskamani filed legislation largely focused on the issues witnessed during her campaign. Eskamani filed an Unemployment Omnibus bill HB 207, that would have among other changes, expanded eligibility for benefits, provide greater oversight for the Department of Economic Opportunity that manages Florida's unemployment system, and most controversially, increase the minimum and maximum weekly benefit by more than $100. HB 207 failed to receive a hearing in the State House, however one aspect of the bill (increasing weekly benefit amounts by $100) passed the Florida Senate unanimously. Eskamani matched the senate's proposed increase in an amendment to HB 1463 that would improve the state's CONNECT website, but that amendment ultimately failed along party lines. Additionally she refiled legislation that would establish renewable energy goals, and a bill that would prohibit public dollars from going to schools that discriminated against LGBT+ students or parents, neither bill received a hearing. Notably, she received her first bill hearing this session with HB 409 that would establish the cy pres doctrine for civil cases which would hopefully increase funding for civil legal aide organizations. The bill received bipartisan support in the Civil Justice and Property Rights Committee and Public Integrity and Election Committee. It ultimately died in the Judiciary Committee after it failed to get a hearing before the end of the 2021 session.

Eskamani successfully passed appropriations projects in the house for local organization in her constituency. However, two appropriations that would benefit mental health counseling for survivors of the Pulse Nightclub Massacre, and money to help fund the Zebra Coalition that provides support for homeless LGBT+ youth, both of which Eskamani sponsored, had been vetoed by governor Ron DeSantis. The governor also vetoed appropriations for The Lifeboat Project which helps human trafficking victims and an appropriation for an ADA improvements for Winter Park Mead Botanical Gardens, a park inside her house district.

2022 Florida Legislative Session 
During the 2022 Legislative Session, Eskamani successfully secured a year long tax break for all children's diapers in the Florida Tax Package, which is expected to be signed into law by Governor Ron DeSantis and would begin on July 1, 2022. She was also effective in stopping new corporate tax giveaways, and secured from than $2 million in the state budget for local funding projects. Another success was fully funding arts and culture grant programs in the State of Florida.

On April 21, 2022, Eskamani attempted to stage a sit-in demonstration to prevent a vote on Florida's congressional district maps. Opponents of the tactic compared her actions to an insurrection. The demonstration was ultimately unsuccessful. 

In early April 2022, Eskamani argued that there hadn't been an "evidence-based analysis" on the impact of the Reedy Creek Improvement District, and described calls for repeal of the Reedy Creek Improvement Act as a message from DeSantis that those who challenge him "will be punished." She also called DeSantis' call for repeal "truly performative."
Later, Eskamani said she opposed the repeal, and congressional redistricting efforts proposed during the special legislative session convened by DeSantis. In a tweet, she added that the actions by the Florida Republican Party were anti-democratic and emblematic of "one party rule drunk on power and bullying anyone in their way into submission." An amendment by Eskamani to restrict special districts from constructing a nuclear power plant, exercising eminent domain outside their borders, and constructing "exclusive" roads that go above the "authority and jurisdiction" of the Florida Department of Transportation was rejected. On Twitter, Eskamani said that the amendment "failed along a party line vote."

References

External links
Official Site (Florida House of Representatives)
 Who is Representative Anna V. Eskamani?

1990 births
21st-century American politicians
21st-century American women politicians
American politicians of Iranian descent
Living people
Democratic Party members of the Florida House of Representatives
People from Orlando, Florida
University High School (Orlando, Florida) alumni
Women state legislators in Florida